Héctor Jesús "Lito" Silva (1 February 1940 – 30 August 2015) was a Uruguayan football forward who played for Uruguay in the 1962 and 1966 FIFA World Cups. He also played for Danubio and C.A. Peñarol.

Hector died on 30 August 2015.

References

External links
FIFA profile

1940 births
2015 deaths
Uruguayan footballers
Uruguay international footballers
Association football forwards
Danubio F.C. players
Peñarol players
Associação Portuguesa de Desportos players
L.D.U. Quito footballers
Uruguayan Primera División players
1962 FIFA World Cup players
1966 FIFA World Cup players
Uruguayan expatriate footballers
Expatriate footballers in Brazil
Expatriate footballers in Ecuador
Uruguayan football managers
Danubio F.C. managers